Cg'ose Ntcox'o (sometimes Xhose Noxo), known as Cgoise (c. 1950 – October 6, 2013) was a Motswana artist.

Ntcox'o was a member of the Ncoakhoe tribe of the San people, and was born in the Ghanzi District of Botswana. She was a member of the Kuru Art Project. In the early 1990s some of her work was shown in a gallery in London and seen by representatives of British Airways, who decided to purchase one of her pieces and to use it as the basis for a design in their ethnic livery scheme. A representative for the airline traveled to Africa to see her; in her telling, she was handed "a piece of paper and told...to make a cross". Despite the fact that she was illiterate, this transaction was held to be binding and to have caused her to transfer the rights to her work. She received 12,000 pula for her work. At the time her husband was ill with tuberculosis and her daughter was unemployed, and she was responsible for supporting a large family.

During her career she collaborated with a group of other San artists from the Kuru Art Project on the publication of Qauqaua, an artists' book published in Johannesburg in 1996. In 1999 she was one of eight artists, four from the Kalahari and four from New Mexico, to participate in a cultural exchange with the University of New Mexico in which they would create a suite of lithographs upon the subject of tricksters in folklore. She is represented in the collections of the Portland Museum of Art and the city of Albuquerque, New Mexico, which displays her lithograph Jujubu and Nxam Veldfood in its City and County Government Building. In 2004 her work appeared on a postage stamp issued by Botswana, one of a set of four depicting works by contemporary artists; others represented in the set included Nxaedom Qhomatca and Qgoma Ncokg'o.

Late in life Ntcox'o was taken in by fellow artist Coex'ae Qgam, with whom she lived until the latter's death. Ntcox'o herself died of a stroke, leaving almost no estate.

References

Year of birth uncertain
1950s births
2013 deaths
Botswana painters
Botswana women painters
20th-century women artists
20th-century painters
20th-century printmakers
Women printmakers
San people
People from Ghanzi District
Botswana printmakers